Tahvo Heikki Rönkkö (8 December 1905 – 15 February 1993) was a Finnish farmer and politician, born in Sonkajärvi. He served as Minister of Agriculture from 14 July 1961 to 13 April 1962. Rönkkö was a Member of the Parliament of Finland from 1948 to 1972, representing the Agrarian League, which renamed itself the Centre Party in 1965.

References

1905 births
1993 deaths
People from Sonkajärvi
People from Kuopio Province (Grand Duchy of Finland)
Centre Party (Finland) politicians
Government ministers of Finland
Members of the Parliament of Finland (1948–51)
Members of the Parliament of Finland (1951–54)
Members of the Parliament of Finland (1954–58)
Members of the Parliament of Finland (1958–62)
Members of the Parliament of Finland (1962–66)
Members of the Parliament of Finland (1966–70)
Members of the Parliament of Finland (1970–72)